Ilja Mohandas "Andy" Hoepelman (born March 26, 1955) is a Dutch former Olympic water polo player and current professor in Medicine, subspecialty Infectious Diseases. He has more than 500 peer reviewed articles on his name.He retired in august 2021. He won an Olympic bronze medal at the 1976 Montreal Olympics as part of the Dutch men's team. He is with his Masters team HZC de Robben European champion in Istanbul (2011), Budapest (2013), Rijeka (2016) and Kranj (2018). In 2015 the team became world Champion in Kazan. From 2012-2016 he was a member of the LEN TWPC (Technical Waterpolo Committee). Since 2017 he has been a member of the World Aquatics (FINA) TWPC, where his interest is in modernizing Waterpolo rules, education of referees and beach water polo.
He was cofounder and chairman of the regional Waterpolo training Centre "Talent Centraal" until 2015 when TC was discontinued. In 2018 he founded together with others a regional Waterpolo training center where he currently serves as chairman. In 2020 he was re-elected as member of LEN TWPC. Since July 2020 he has been chairman of the Dutch Waterpolo club UZSC, 6 times champion in the Netherlands since 2014.In December 2020 he stepped down and became vicechairman.

Life 
Hoepelman obtained MD and PhD degrees from Utrecht University, writing a dissertation entitled Iron and Infection. He worked at Rockefeller University in New York City and was head of the Department of Internal Medicine and Infectious Diseases at the University Medical Center in Utrecht until 2017. Since that time he has been Head of the division of Infectious Diseases at the University Medical Center. More than 50 students finished there thesis under his supervision. He has authored more than 500 peer reviewed publications

His sons Ruben Hoepelman and Benjamin Hoepelman have followed their father in playing water polo at an international level, his son David is a specialist in informatics.

See also
 List of Olympic medalists in water polo (men)

References

External links
 

1955 births
Living people
Dutch infectious disease physicians
Dutch male water polo players
Olympic bronze medalists for the Netherlands in water polo
Water polo players at the 1976 Summer Olympics
People from Hilversum
Sportspeople from Hilversum
Utrecht University alumni
Academic staff of Utrecht University
Medalists at the 1976 Summer Olympics
Dutch sports executives and administrators